{{DISPLAYTITLE:C2H6O}}
The molecular formula C2H6O (molar mass: 46.07 g/mol, exact mass: 46.0419 u) may refer to:

 Dimethyl ether (DME, or methoxymethane)
 Ethanol

Other
The name of an exhibition by Carla Arocha and Stéphane Schraenen